Sappho was launched at Shields in 1785. She spent most of her career trading with the Baltic, though she made some voyages elsewhere, and in particular, between 1788 and 1799 she made a voyage to the Falkland Islands as a whaler. She was last listed in 1798, having perhaps been captured in late 1797.

Career
Sappho first appeared in Lloyd's Register in 1786.

Whaling voyage (1787–1789): Captain Thomas Middleton sailed from London on 5 December 1787, bound for the Falkland Islands. In April 1789 Sappho and Elizabeth and Mary, Jame Hopper, master, were in Port Desire when a Spanish frigate arrived and confiscated thousands of seal skins they had gathered. Sappho herself had to give up some 7,000 seal skins. Sappho returned to London on 16 July 1789 with one tun of sperm oil, eight tuns of whale oil, four cwt whale bone, and 19,000 seal skins.

Fate
Sappho was last listed in 1798 with data unchanged from 1796.

A French privateer captured and took into Bordeaux in 1797 a Sappho, Elliot, master, as Sappho was sailing from Lisbon to Limerick. Although at the time Sappho was a unique name in LR, it may require original research to determine whether the captured Sappho was the Sappho of this article.

Citations and references
Citations

References

1785 ships
Ships built on the River Tyne
Age of Sail merchant ships of England
Whaling ships